Sergio Bustamante is a Mexican artist and sculptor. He was born in Culiacan, Sinaloa, in 1949, and studied architecture at the University of Guadalajara.

Bustamante's first art exhibition showcased paintings and papier-mâché figures at the Galeria Misracha in Mexico City in 1966. In 1975, Bustamante was part of a group of artists that established the "Family Workshop Studio" in Tlaquepaque, Jalisco. In the mid-1970s, his practice expanded to include wood and bronze sculpture.

Works
 In Search of Reason (2000)

External links
 
Meyers Gallery bio
www.artsoleil.ch
www.santafeshop.com

Mexican contemporary artists
Living people
1949 births
Paper artists
University of Guadalajara alumni
People from Culiacán
Papier-mâché